My Guitar Wants To Kill Your Mama is an album by Dweezil Zappa. It was released in 1988 by Chrysalis Records.

Track listing
"Her Eyes Don't Follow Me" - 3:51
"The Coolest Guy in the World" - 4:32
"My Guitar Wants to Kill Your Mama" - 4:11
"Comfort of Strangers" - 4:11
"Bang Your Groove Thang" - 3:35
"Your Money or Your Life" - 4:14
"Shameless" - 3:11
"Before I Get Old" - 3:57
"When You're Near Me" - 3:10
"Nasty Bizness" - 3:04
"You Don't Know When to Love Me" - 3:23

 All written by Dweezil Zappa, except #3 by Frank Zappa.

Personnel

Musicians
Dweezil Zappa – guitar, keyboards, vocals
Scott Thunes – bass
Bobby Blotzer – drums (5)
Terry Bozzio – drums (2, 4, 10)
Steve Smith – drums (1, 3, 6-8)
Fiona – vocals (4)
Ahmet Zappa – vocals (2)
Nate Winger – background vocals
Paul Winger – background vocals
Beau Hill – background vocals

Production
Beau Hill – producer, engineer
Annie Leibovitz – photography
John Williams – art direction

References

Dweezil Zappa albums
1988 albums
Chrysalis Records albums